John Cairnes may refer to:

John Cairnes (politician), Irish MP for Augher
John Elliott Cairnes (1823–1875), Irish economist

See also
John Cairns (disambiguation)